ARY Zindagi is a Pakistani pay television entertainment channel and a part of ARY Digital Network. The channel airs a variety of Indian, Turkish and Pakistani programs. ARY Zindagi was first aired on 5 April 2014 as a test run available on AsiaSat 3S 105.5 Degree East. The channel was originally launched on 11 April 2014. The channel came in place of the food channel ARY Zauq.

Programs 
ARY Zindagi aired original content when it first launched; but soon started old ended series from ARY Digital and now airs only ended programming from ARY Digital. The only original program on-air is Salaam Zindagi.

References

External links

ARY Digital
ARY Zindagi original programming
Television channels and stations established in 2014
Television stations in Pakistan
Urdu-language television channels
Television stations in Karachi